Michela Magas is a designer, entrepreneur and innovation specialist, of Croatian-British nationality, and is the first woman from the Creative Industries to receive the European Woman Innovator of the Year award by the European Commission.

Family and education 
She is the daughter of the architects Olga and Boris Magaš, and was raised in Rijeka, Croatia, where she was educated at Italian elementary and secondary schools, before graduating in design from the Royal College of Art in London.

Career 
From 1995 until the end of 2000 she worked at the Financial Times, as a designer, becoming Art Editor.

She is the co-founder, with Peter Russell-Clarke, of the London-based design innovation lab Stromatolite, whose clients include Nike, Nokia and Apple.

She is the founder of Music Tech Fest, and chairs the Industry Commons Foundation.

In December 2019 she was recognised as an "Outstanding Peer Reviewer" by Leonardo, the International Society for the Arts, Sciences and Technology.

In 2016 she was awarded Innovation Luminary for Creative Innovation by the European Commission.

Since about 2015, she has lived in Umeå, Sweden, and works nomadically.

Publications 

 Magas, M., Radziwon, A., Altosaar, A., Wretblad, L., Emanuilov, I., Bertels, N., 2022. White Paper: IP and Industry Agreements towards Industry Commons. Link
 Magas, M., 2022 contribution to European Commission, Directorate-General for Communications Networks, Content and Technology, Izsak, K., Terrier, A., Kreutzer, S., et al. Opportunities and challenges of artificial intelligence technologies for the cultural and creative sectors. Publications Office of the European Union.  Link
 Magas, M., Dubber, A. and Marsden, R., 2022. Intellectual Property and the Industry Commons: Unlocking the Renaissance, in European Crew, 2022, The Next Renaissance Culture and Creativity Shaping Europe, Odile Jacob Link
 Magas, M. (contributor) in Martin, C. et al, 2022. Backing Visionary Entrepreneurs: Realising the Deep-Tech Entrepreneurial Talent of Europe (Report of the EIC Expert Group on Design of the EIC Marketplace and Tech to Market Activities), European Innovation Council 
 Michela Magas & Dimitris Kiritsis, 2021. Industry Commons: an ecosystem approach to horizontal enablers for sustainable cross-domain industrial innovation (a positioning paper), International Journal of Production Research, DOI: 10.1080/00207543.2021.1989514 Link
 Magas, M. et al, 2021. New European Bauhaus: Concept paper by the High-Level Roundtable, European Commission. Link
 Magas, M., 2020. Green Paper: CCI Innovation to Lead Beyond the Pandemic, presented at Framing Creative Futures – The 10th European Creative Industries Summit (ECIS 2020). Link
Magas, M, and Dubber, A., 2020. Expanding EOSC: Engagement of the wider public and private sectors in EOSC, Study funded by the European Union’s Horizon Programme call H2020-INFRAEOSC-2018-4, Grant Agreement number 831644, EOSCsecretariat.eu 2020. Link
Magas, M. in Taisch, M., Casidsid, M.L., May, G., Morin, T.R., Padelli, V., Pinzone, M., Wuest, T. (eds)., 2020. World Manufacturing Report 2020: Manufacturing in the Age of Artificial Intelligence. Link
Magas, M., 2018. 7 Ingredients for the Industry Commons. Link
Magas, M. and Koek, A., Lerhman-Madsen, O., Beetz, K., Curley, M., de Waele, W., Herlitschka, S., 2016. CAF Innovation Recommendations, H2020 Work Programme 2018–2020. DG Connect Advisory Forum, European Commission.
 Magas, M., Fledderus, E. and Herlitschka, S., et al. 2016. CAF's recommendations for H2020's work program 2018–2020. DG Connect Advisory Forum, European Commission.
 Magas, M. and Dubber, A. 2016. Final Public Report. #MusicBricks European Commission H2020 project report.
 Magas, M., van der Klauw, K. et al., 2015. Report on Analysis and Recommendations for Innovation Ecosystems: The Alliance for Internet of Things Innovation (AIOTI). Published by the European Commission in October 2015.
 Magas, M., Lidy, T., and Schindler, A., 2015. MusicBricks: Connecting digital Creators to the Internet of Music Things. ERCIM NEWS, 101, pp.39–40.
Magas, M., Laurier, C., 2014. Audio analysis system and method using audio segment characterisation. UK Intellectual Property Office Patent No. GB2523973B.Link
 Magas, M., Dubber, A., Sterne, J., Baym, N., et al., 2014. Manifesto for Music Technologists. Published by Microsoft Research Link
 Magas, M., Serra, X., Benetos, E., Chudy, M., Dixon, S., Flexer, A., Paytuvi, O., 2013. Roadmap for music information research. EU FP7.Link
 Magas, M. and Proutskova, P., 2013. A location-tracking interface for ethnomusicological collections. Journal of New Music Research, 42(2), pp.151–160.
 Magas, M., and Rea, C. 2012. Synaesthesia: Innovative music components for collaborating and creating music with objects in real space. Proceedings of the NEM Summit, Istanbul.
 Magas, M. and Proutskova, P., 2009. A location-tracking interface for ethnomusicological collections. In Workshop on Exploring Musical Information Spaces.
 Magas, M., Stewart, R. and Fields, B., 2009, August. decibel 151. In ACM SIGGRAPH 2009 Art Gallery (p. 21). ACM.
 Magas, M. and Proutskova, P. 2009. Beyond the metadata, new intelligent audio content search for large music collections. Unlocking Audio 2, British Library, London, UK.
 Magas, M. and Proutskova, P., 2009. A location-tracking interface for ethnomusicological collections. Proceedings of ECDL. Corfu, Greece.
 Magas, M., Casey, M.A. and Rhodes, C., 2008, August. mHashup: fast visual music discovery via locality sensitive hashing. In SIGGRAPH New Tech Demos (p. 26).
 Magas, M., Rhodes, C., Casey, M., d’Inverno, M., Knopke, I., and Slaney, M. 2008. Dark Media Navigation With the Audio

Media coverage
Nomad Magazine covered Collaborative Innovator Michela Magas
JN.pt covered Aveiro Tech week 2022
 TOUCHIT.sk covered Festival Art & Tech Days 2021 
  on EIT Kultur & Kreativität - eine wegweisende Partnerschaft für ein erfolgreiches Europa
OAGi (Open Applications Group): Industrial Ontologies Foundry Releases Core Ontology Beta
Royal College of Art interview with Michela Magas
 Ara.cat on Michela Magas
 Forbes on Michela Magas and MTF
Market insider on Music Tech Fest Hosts MTF Labs Together With Infobip in Croatia
Leonardo.info on Recognition of outstanding peer reviewers
Dagens industri covers Michela Magas
 BBC The Next Web on How the first Music Tech Fest explored the future of sound
 Bergenna.no covered Gründer-gatefest på OPPNÅ
 Financial Times Michela Magas' nomadic working life
 Yle Finland on Music Tech Fest -ryhmälle musiikki on sosiaalista liimaa: "Me emme ennusta tulevaisuutta, vaan luomme sitä"
 Poslovni.hr on Michela Magaš
 Vecernhi list on Živjela sam u Caritasu, jela tost. Slomila sam se kad je tata imao infarkt, no tad su me profesori ‘prošvercali’ pod studenta iz EU 
 Dnevni avaz on Svjetski inovatori i studenti zajedničkim snagama pokreću inovativnu BiH
VIDI on Michela Magaš
Radio MOF: Interview with Michela Magas
24SATA on Michela Magaš
BBC on Michela Magaš
BBC European Prize for Women Innovators
Women in Adria Što treba da bi se bilo najinovativnija europska poduzetnica Michela Magaš?
Telegram Media Group: Michela Magaš europska je inovatorica godine, a ovo je njezin prvi životni intervju za naše medije
Novi list Michela Magaš osvojila nagradu EU za inovatoricu godine: Riječanka tražilicom glazbe osvaja Europu
Jutarnji List: Michela magaš, ona je vjerojatno najpoznatija hrvatica za koju niste čuli Svojim je inovacijama nevjerojatno utjecala na vaše živote i učinila ih lagodnijima
Telegram Media Group: Donosimo veliku vijest; Michela Magaš jučer je u Bruxellesu proglašena inovatoricom godine
Jutarnji List: Hrvatica Michela Magaš osvojila je prvu nagradu za EU inovatoricu godine i 100.000 eura, ali njen laboratorij za inovacije u dizajnu je u Britaniji
Poslovni dnevnik: Michela Magaš dobitnica Nagrade Europske unije za inovatorice 2017
The Calvert Journal: Croatian-British entrepreneur wins EU Prize for Women Innovators
MTF Labs: Interview at Swedish Ambassador’s residence in Croatia
WIRED Magazine (guest edited by Barack Obama): Bionic Artist Viktoria Modesta Transcends the Human Body
Open Innovation 2.0 Conference 2016: Innovation Luminary Awards Ceremony Interview 
Collective Awareness Platforms for Sustainability and Social Innovation: Interview for CAPS 2015
 #OI2Conf Dublin: interview with Michela Magas, Stromatolite
Digital Music trends: Michela Magas of Stromatolite and Music Tech Fest
NEM Summit 2010: Interview with Michela Magas

References

External links 

 
 
 BBC click episode including feature on Magas' EU Prize for Women Innovators 2017

Living people
Year of birth missing (living people)
Place of birth missing (living people)
Croatian women in business
British women in business
People from Umeå
Writers from Rijeka
Croatian emigrants to the United Kingdom